Nawayathi, also spelled as Nawayati, is a dialect of Konkani spoken by Nawayaths of the southwestern coast of India. It is an amalgam of Persian, Arabic and Marathi, with Konkani as its base. The Navayath language uses Persian script for writing.  "Persian script" was being used to write by the Nawayathis long before the Urdu language came into existence.

References 

Languages of India
Konkani